"Saint Pablo" is a song by American rapper Kanye West, featuring prominent vocals by British singer Sampha. It originally surfaced online on March 31, 2016 after it had been leaked onto Apple Music by mistake before being removed hours later. The song was later added to West's seventh studio album, The Life of Pablo (2016) on June 14, 2016.

Composition

The song addresses West's thoughts and insecurities, including the Twitter controversies and his $53-million debt (at the time).

"Saint Pablo" was produced by West himself and Mike Dean, with co-production from Allen Ritter and additional production from Noah Goldstein. It features vocals from Sampha, who sings the hook and the third verse. The song contains samples of "Where I'm From", written by Shawn Carter, Deric Angelettie, Ronald Lawrence and Norman Whitfield, and performed by Jay Z.

Release
"Saint Pablo" was first premiered at Yo Gotti's The Art of Hustle release party. On March 31, 2016, the track was leaked online and appeared on Apple Music for several hours. On June 15, 2016, West temporarily removed The Life of Pablo from Tidal because he wanted to add "Saint Pablo" into the album. The track has been made widely available on Tidal, Apple Music, Google Play Music and Spotify since this removal.

Critical reception
“Saint Pablo“ was met with universal acclaim from listeners and music critics alike. NME author NME Blog had heavy praise for the track, describing it as West being: 'in classically confident mode, despite the fact he opens up the epic track by admitting that he's in debt'.

References

2016 songs
Kanye West songs
Sampha songs
Song recordings produced by Kanye West
Song recordings produced by Mike Dean (record producer)
Songs written by Allen Ritter
Songs written by Jay-Z
Songs written by Kanye West
Songs written by Mike Dean (record producer)
Songs written by Norman Whitfield
Songs written by Sampha
Song recordings produced by Allen Ritter